Balázs Németh (born 12 June 1988, in Budapest) is a Hungarian motorcycle racer. He currently races in the Alpe Adria Road Racing Supersport Championship aboard a Triumph Daytona 675.

Career

Early career

Németh began his career at the age of 6, with minimotos. He raced until 2005 in various categories, and he was multiple Hungarian champion.

Superstock and Supersport

His debut in the Superstock 600 championship was in 2005. In his second race, in the Hungarian championship, he was in the podium, and in a race in the Hungaroring, he was in the podium, but now in the international championship.

From 2006, Németh competed in the Superstock 1000 category. He spent there three years, and in this time, he achieved two victories and another two podium finishes. His best overall position was 4th. In this year, he was the best young Hungarian motorcycle racer.

In 2008 he competed in eight races in the Supersport championship, but he failed to score points despite finishing in all races. His best position was 16th.

250cc

After Gábor Talmácsi left Balatonring Team because of financial reasons and the scarcity of his second bike, Jorge Martínez wanted another Hungarian motorcycle racer, and signed Németh just before the Italian race. He scored his first point in the Czech Grand Prix, he finished in the 14h position. He was 23th overall with 11 points.

Career statistics

By season

Races by year

Supersport World Championship

Races by year

References

1988 births
Living people
Hungarian motorcycle racers
250cc World Championship riders
Supersport World Championship riders
Sportspeople from Budapest
FIM Superstock 1000 Cup riders